Skate Boardin', also known as Skateboardin'  and Skate Boardin': A Radical Adventure, is a video game developed by Absolute Entertainment for the Atari 2600 and published in 1987 by Activision. It was written by Absolute co-founder David Crane, creator of the hugely successful Pitfall!  It is one of the first skateboarding-based video games, preceded by at least the 720° arcade game and Skate Rock for the Commodore 64, both from 1986.

Gameplay

The player must locate and successfully negotiate thirty hidden tricks in the form of ramps and pipes within a time limit of five minutes. To save time it is possible to skitch on the back of moving vehicles. The fire button makes the player jump, which is necessary for remounting the skateboard after falling off. Jumping can also be used to get past hurdles. Continuing to hold the fire button results in a crouch, needed for passing through pipes.

Additional challenges include finding the most efficient route through the maze and avoiding various obstacles that slow the player down.

Legacy
A sequel was released in 1988 for the Atari 7800 called Super Skateboardin'''.Skate Boardin''' was re-released in 2002, as part of the Activision Anthology collection.

References

External links
''Skateboardin''' at Atari Mania

1987 video games
Absolute Entertainment games
Activision games
Atari 2600 games
Single-player video games
Skateboarding video games
Video games developed in the United States